The United Sabah Assembly Party or  (PUSAKA) was a political party based in Sabah, Malaysia formed by Kalakau Untol in 1977 and dissolved in 1978 after he joined Parti Bersatu Rakyat Jelata Sabah (BERJAYA).

See also
Politics of Malaysia
List of political parties in Malaysia

References

Defunct political parties in Sabah
1977 establishments in Malaysia
1978 disestablishments in Malaysia
Political parties established in 1977
Political parties disestablished in 1978
Ethnic political parties
Indigenist political parties